Stavros Xenidis (1924 - 2 November 2008) was a Greek actor.  He was married to actress Margarita Lambrinou.

Biography
Stavros Xenidis was born in Turkey. He studied acting in Karolos Koun's Theatro Technis and made his theatre début in 1944. His theatre career was closely associated with Kostas Moussouris' theatrical company during the 1950s and the 1960s .  As a film actor, he took part in more than 70 movies, mostly in secondary roles; his first film role was in "The Song of Pain" (1953) (Greek title: "Το Τραγούδι του Πόνου") and his last was in "Red White" (1993) ("Άσπρο Κόκκινο").

He also appeared in several TV shows since 1971; His last appearance on television was in 1994.

He died in a retirement home in Athens on 2 November 2008, after suffering a number of strokes.

Selected filmography

Cinema

Television

References

External links

1924 births
2008 deaths
Greek male actors
Male actors from Athens
Male actors from Istanbul
Constantinopolitan Greeks
Turkish emigrants to Greece